This article lists events that occurred during 1974 in Estonia.

Incumbents

Events
First Saaremaa Rally took place.
Construction works of Hotel Olümpia were started (ended in 1980).

Births
14 May – Anu Välba, Estonian TV and radio host

Deaths

References

 
1970s in Estonia
Estonia
Estonia
Years of the 20th century in Estonia